Poroshenko is a Ukrainian surname. Notable people with this surname include:
 Petro Poroshenko (born 1965), Ukrainian politician and former President of Ukraine
 Maryna Poroshenko (born 1962), wife of Petro, former First Lady of Ukraine
 Oleksiy Poroshenko (born 1985), Ukrainian politician